Carlton Soccer Club, an association football club based in Jolimont, Melbourne, was founded in 1997. They were admitted into the National Soccer League for the 1997–98 season. They dissolved in 2000 and effectively left the 2000–01 National Soccer League after eight matches.

Dean Anastasiadis held the record for the greatest number of appearances for Carlton. The Australian goalkeeper played 92 times for the club. The club's goalscoring record was held by Alex Moreira who scored 27 goals.

Key
 The list is ordered first by date of debut, and then if necessary in alphabetical order.
 Appearances as a substitute are included.

Players

References
General
 
 

Specific

Carlton S.C. players
Carlton
Association football player non-biographical articles